The Moisea is a left tributary of the river Seaca in Romania. It flows into the Seaca in the village Moișa.

References

Rivers of Romania
Rivers of Suceava County